The women's 100 metres was an event at the 1996 Summer Olympics in Atlanta, Georgia. There were a total number of 56 participating athletes, with two rounds (seven heats in round 1, four heats at round 2), two semifinals and a final. Although both Gail Devers of the United States and Merlene Ottey of Jamaica had clocked the same time in the final at the finish line at 10.94 seconds, snapshot of their photo finish confirmed that Devers had edged Ottey out for the gold medal.

Records
These were the standing world and Olympic records (in seconds) prior to the 1996 Summer Olympics.

Results

Heats

Heat 1

Heat 2

Heat 3

Heat 4

Heat 5

Heat 6

Heat 7

Quarterfinals

Quarterfinal 1

Quarterfinal 2

Quarterfinal 3

Quarterfinal 4

Semifinals

Semifinal 1

Semifinal 2

Final
Held on July 27, 1996

References

100 metres
100 metres at the Olympics
1996 in women's athletics
Women's events at the 1996 Summer Olympics